The 1934 FIFA World Cup final was the second edition of the football quadrennial tournament match contested by the men's national teams of FIFA to determine the 1934 FIFA World Cup champions: Italy and Czechoslovakia. It took place on 10 June 1934 at the Stadio Nazionale PNF in Rome, Italy. 

After going a goal down, Italy came back to win the match 2–1 despite temperatures approaching .

The last surviving player from that final was Czechoslovakia goalkeeper František Plánička who died on 20 July 1996 at the age of 92.

Background
Uruguay boycotted the 1934 edition due to the lack of European teams in the previous tournament and Argentina was eliminated in the first round of the tournament by Sweden, assured that a previous team would not be defending their title.

This was the debut for each team in the FIFA World Cup. This was the eleventh contest between the two teams, their immediate previous match being at the 1933–35 Central European International Cup held in Florence, Italy; Italy prevailed 2–0. This leveled the head-to-head in the World Cup match to three all with four draws.

Route to the final

Match

Summary
Czechoslovakia took the lead with 19 minutes remaining through Antonín Puč. They held the lead for only 10 minutes as Italy drew level through striker Raimundo Orsi. Without any additional goals in regulation, the match was forced to go into the inaugural instance of a World Cup final extra time. With five minutes play, Italy took the lead with a goal from Angelo Schiavio; they held on for the victory.

Details

References

Bibliography

External links
1934 FIFA World Cup Final at Planet World Cup

World Cup Final 1934
FIFA World Cup finals
Final
World Cup Final 1934
1934
Final
Final
Sports competitions in Rome
1930s in Rome
June 1934 sports events